The 1974–75 Segunda División was the 26th season of the Mexican Segunda División. The season started on 14 July 1974 and concluded on 5 July 1975. It was won by UAG.

Changes 
 UANL was promoted to Primera División as Segunda División winners.
 U. de G. bought the franchise belonging to Torreón and was promoted to Primera Division.
 Unión de Curtidores and U. de S.L.P. were invited to the Primera Division due to an expansion of teams, as the league went from 18 to 20 teams.
 San Luis was relegated from Primera División.
 UAEM was relegated from Segunda División.
 Celaya, Deportivo Acapulco, Inter Acapulco, Tecnológico de Celaya, Atlético Tepeji del Río, Iguala, Ciudad Sahagún, Córdoba, and UAT were promoted from Tercera División.
 Pachuca was on hiatus for this season.
 Zamora requested to play in the Tercera División for internal reasons.
 Halcones Saltillo joined as an expansion team.

Teams

Group stage

Group 1

Group 2

Group 3

Results

Championship Group

Final

Relegation Playoffs

References 

1974–75 in Mexican football
Segunda División de México seasons